The Complex of game sports is an indoor arena located in Olympic Complex, Ashgabat, Turkmenistan. It is owned and operated by Government of Turkmenistan for 2017 Asian Indoor and Martial Arts Games. It has a seating capacity of 15,000 for concerts, for the sports like basketball, volleyball, handball, badminton, modern rhythmic gymnastics and artistic gymnastics, fencing, table tennis, trampoline tumbling, judo and wrestling.

Structure of the building 
The building has a universal arena 70m х 40 m.

Sporting Events 
 2017 Asian Indoor and Martial Arts Games
 2020 AFC Futsal Championship

References

External links
 Photos 
 Main Indoor Arena 
 Scheme of arena 

Sports venues in Ashgabat
2016 establishments in Turkmenistan
Sports venues completed in 2016